Tuy An is a district (huyện) of Phú Yên province in the South Central Coast region of Vietnam.

Districts of Phú Yên province